The Port of Hamburg is a seaport on the river Elbe in Hamburg, Germany,  from its mouth on the North Sea.

Known as Germany's "Gateway to the World" (Tor zur Welt), it is the country's largest seaport by volume. In terms of TEU throughput, Hamburg is the third-busiest port in Europe (after Rotterdam and Antwerp) and 15th-largest worldwide. In 2014, 9.73 million TEUs (20-foot standard container equivalents) were handled in Hamburg.

The port covers an area of  (64.80 km2 usable), of which 43.31 km2 (34.12 km2) are land areas. The branching Elbe creates an ideal place for a port complex with warehousing and transshipment facilities. The extensive free port was established when Hamburg joined the German Customs Union. It enabled duty-free storing of imported goods and also importing of materials which were processed, re-packaged, used in manufacturing and then re-exported without incurring customs duties. The free port was abandoned in 2013.

History

The port is almost as old as the history of Hamburg itself. Founded on 7 May 1189 by Frederick I at a strategic location near the mouth of the Elbe, it has been Central Europe's main port for centuries and enabled Hamburg to develop early into a leading city of trade with a rich and proud bourgeoisie.

During the age of the Hanseatic League from the 13th to 16th century, Hamburg was considered second only to the port and city of Lübeck in terms of its position as a central trading node for sea-borne trade. With discovery of the Americas and the emerging transatlantic trade, Hamburg exceeded all other German ports. During the second half of the 19th century, Hamburg became Central Europe's main hub for transatlantic passenger and freight travel, and from 1871 onward it was Germany's principal port of trade. In her time the Hamburg America Line was the largest shipping company in the world. Since 1888, the HADAG runs a scheduled ferry service across various parts of the port and the Elbe. The Free Port, established on 15 October 1888, enabled traders to ship and store goods without going through customs and further enhanced Hamburg's position in sea trade with neighbouring countries. The Moldauhafen has a similar arrangement, though related to the Czech Republic exclusively.

The Speicherstadt, one of Hamburg's architectural icons today, is a large wharf area of 350,000 m2 floor area on the northern shore of the river, built in the 1880s as part of the free port and to cope with the growing quantity of goods stored in the port.

Hamburg shipyards lost fleets twice after World War I and World War II. Moreover, during II World War, Hamburg harbour was the hub destination of the Hamburg America Line, that assured the Nazi Party a connection to the United States for the import of oil and steel, and the export of manifactures from Germany thanks to container ships. The shipping line Hamburg-Amerikanische Packetfahrt-Aktien-Gesellschaft (HAPAG) gave the name to the so-called shipping company based in Hamburg which used to run the trades of goods on this route. In 1970, alongside with Norddeutscher Lloyd, the present-day active company Hapag-Lloyd was founded.

During the partition of Germany between 1945 and 1990, the Port of Hamburg lost much of its hinterland and consequently many of its trading connections. However, since German reunification, the fall of the Iron Curtain and European enlargement, Hamburg has made substantial ground as one of Europe's prime logistics centres and as one of the world's largest and busiest sea ports.

In 2022, the German government let The Chinese state-owned COSCO Shipping take a stake in ownership of the port.

Access

Deepening of the river Elbe for large vessels is controversial for ecological reasons. In part due to cooperation with Lower Saxony and Bremen to build a new container port (JadeWeserPort) in the deep waters of Jadebusen in Wilhelmshaven, Hamburg withdrew from this plan after a change of government in 2001.

Hamburg Port Authority 
The port is administered by the Hamburg Port Authority. The Hamburg Port Authority is described as having adopted an innovative approach. In November 2016 the Hamburg Port Authority ordered a modern fireboat budgeted at 16 million euros.

Terminals

Cruise

Hamburg is a major cruise destination and one of Europe's largest ports of call for cruise passengers traveling the Atlantic, or the Norwegian and Baltic Seas. The port is also a major location for shipbuilder and shipyards, designing, building and reconditioning yachts and cruise liners. Hamburg has three passenger terminals for cruise ships: Hamburg Cruise Center HafenCity, the Hamburg Cruise Center Altona and the Hamburg Cruise Center Steinwerder, all three capable of processing the world's largest cruise ships.

Culture

The Port of Hamburg is also one of Hamburg's largest attractions, both as a living, industrial and logistic center but also as a backdrop for modern culture and the port's history. Among these are various museum ships, musical theaters, bars, restaurants and hotels - and even a floating boat church.

The annual celebration of the port's birthday (Hafengeburtstag) during the first weekend of May is one of Hamburg's biggest public events. National and international visitors come to experience the festivities. Tugboats perform "ballets", old galleons and new cruise ships are open for tours, and fireworks explode at night.

Tour guides on boat tours in the port are called he lüchts (Low German for he is lying) after an often used call of dock workers when they overheard the stories told to tourists.

See also

 BallinStadt 
 Elbe 17

References

External links

 Port of Hamburg Website
 Hamburg Chamber of Commerce Port of Hamburg: Facts, figures, and outlook
 HafenCity Website
 The Elbe Philharmonic Hall Currently under construction in the HafenCity
 Arts in the HafenCity
 Ship Movements, Photos & Videos from Hamburg
 List of Webcams in the Port of Hamburg

Transport in Hamburg
Geography of Hamburg
Hamburg
River ports of Germany
Ports and harbours of the North Sea